The 1946–47 season was the 48th completed season of The Football League.

This season was the first to feature a full football programme since the 1938–39 campaign. Division placings were the same as in the unfinished 1939–40 Football League.

Final division tables
Beginning with the season 1894–95, clubs finishing level on points were separated according to goal average (goals scored divided by goals conceded), or more properly put, goal ratio. In case one or more teams had the same goal difference, this system favoured those teams who had scored fewer goals. The goal average system was eventually scrapped beginning with the 1976–77 season.

From the 1922–23 season, the bottom two teams of both Third Division North and Third Division South were required to apply for re-election.

First Division

After a tight title race involving several clubs in the First Division, Liverpool won their fifth league title, finishing one point ahead of their nearest rivals Manchester United (who won two league titles before the World War I) and Wolverhampton Wanderers (who had yet to win a First Division title). Stoke City and Blackpool completed the top five.

Leeds United were relegated in bottom place after just six wins all season. They were joined by a Brentford side who failed to match their promising pre-war form, and they would not return to the top flight until 2021.

Results

Maps

Second Division

Results

Maps

Third Division North

Results

Maps

Third Division South

Results

Maps

See also
1946-47 in English football
1946 in association football
1947 in association football

References
Ian Laschke: Rothmans Book of Football League Records 1888–89 to 1978–79. Macdonald and Jane’s, London & Sydney, 1980.

English Football League seasons
Eng
1